Daniel Dwayne Wells (born October 25, 1974) is an American reality television personality and actor. He is best known for playing the role of Eric Simpson in Watch Over Me.

He also appeared on Days of Our Lives in an unconventional story; his character Stan was one of the show's main female characters in disguise.

In recent years, Wells changed careers and now works in the fitness field. He opened several gyms and has appeared on talk shows as a fitness expert. In 2016, he appeared on NBC's Strong as one of the trainers for the competitors.

Filmography

Film

TV shows

References

External links
 

1973 births
Living people
American male film actors
American male television actors
Participants in American reality television series
Male actors from Orange County, California